Premier is a title for the head of government in  central governments, state governments and local governments of some countries.  A second in command to a premier is designated as a deputy premier.

A premier will normally be a head of government, but is not the head of state. In presidential systems, the two roles are often combined into one, whereas in parliamentary systems of government the two are usually kept separate.

Relationship to the term "prime minister"
"Premier" is often the title of the heads of government in sub-national entities, such as the provinces and territories of Canada, states of the Commonwealth of Australia, provinces of South Africa, the island of Nevis within the Federation of Saint Kitts and Nevis, and the nation of Niue. In some of these cases, the formal title remains "Prime Minister" but "Premier" is used to avoid confusion with the national leader. In these cases, care should be taken not to confuse the title of "premier" with "prime minister". In these countries, terms such as "Federal Premier", "National Premier" or "Premier of the Dominion" were sometimes used to refer to prime ministers, although these are now obsolete.

Etymology

The word comes from French  which means prime minister. Premier meaning 'first', coming from Latin prīmārius. This is why in many nations, "premier" is used interchangeably with "prime minister".

Examples by country
In the People's Republic of China, "premier" is more common and official, but "prime minister" is still used (see Premier of the People's Republic of China).

In the Republic of China (Taiwan), the head of government is the official name of the President of the Executive Yuan, but it can also be abbreviated to Premier.

In Cambodia, "Premier" means the "Prime Minister". In Federation of Bosnia and Herzegovina, sub-national entity of Bosnia and Herzegovina, as well in cantons, head of government have formal title of "premier", often anglicized as "prime minister", while national prime minister is Chairman of the Council of Ministers of Bosnia and Herzegovina, but "premier" is sometimes colloquially used.

In the Czech Republic, the head of government is colloquially called “Premiér”, and the Czech language translates both “Premier” and “Prime Minister” as “Premiér”. However, although his post is commonly translated in English as “Prime Minister”, the official title as per articles 67 and 68 of the Constitution is “Předseda vlády”, literally “President of the Government”.

In Croatia, the head of government is officially called “President of the Government” (predsjednik vlade) but “Premier” (premijer) is colloquially used.

In Serbia, the head of government is officially called "President of the Government" (predsednik vlade) but "Premier" (premijer) is colloquially used.

In Poland, the head of government is officially called "President of the Council of Ministers" but "Premier" (polish for Prime Minister) is colloquially used.

In Italy, the President of the Council of Ministers, an office equivalent to prime minister, is informally referred to as the "Premier".

In North Macedonia the head of the government is named premier (Macedonian премиер, premier), usually translated in English as prime minister.

In the Soviet Union, the title of premier was applied to the Chairman of the Council of People's Commissars, named Chairman of the Council of Ministers after 1946, which became the Prime Minister of the Soviet Union in 1991.

In Malaysia, the head of the Sarawak state government is known as the Premier of Sarawak following a state constitutional amendment in 2022, a move widely seen to reflect the status of Sarawak as an equal partner with Sabah and Malaya in Malaysia as stipulated in the 1963 Malaysia Agreement (MA63).

By jurisdiction
 Premiers of Australia
 Premier of Bermuda
 Premier of the British Virgin Islands
 Premiers of Canada
 Premier of the Cayman Islands
 Premier of the People's Republic of China
 List of premiers of China
 Chancellor of China
 Premier of North Korea
 Premier of Montserrat
 Premiers of South Africa
 Premier of the Soviet Union
 Premier of the Republic of China (Taiwan)
 Premier of the Turks and Caicos Islands
 President of the Council of Ministers

See also

 Westminster system
 Constitutional monarchy
 Semi-presidential system
 Semi-parliamentary system
 Parliamentary republic
 Parliamentary leader

References
 

 
Heads of government
Positions of authority
Positions of subnational authority
Gubernatorial titles